Coshocton City School District is a public school district serving the City of Coshocton, Ohio. The school district consists of approximately 1,600 students in grades K-12.

Schools
High Schools
Coshocton High School and Coshocton Junior High share one building.

Elementary Schools
Coshocton Elementary School

External links
Coshocton City Schools website
Board of Education website
Athletic Department website
Football website

Education in Coshocton County, Ohio
School districts in Ohio